The Work Habit is a 1913 short silent film, starring Lionel Barrymore in the early days of his film career in his second or fifth year of film (unknown if Barrymore's film appearance was in 1908 or 1911). The film is lost.

References

External links

1913 films
1913 lost films
American black-and-white films
American silent short films
Lost American films
1910s English-language films
1910s American films